"Big Deal" is a song written by Jeffrey Steele and Al Anderson, and recorded by American country music artist LeAnn Rimes.  It was released on September 28, 1999, as the first single from her eponymous album. The song charted at number 6 on the US country charts and number 23 on the US Hot 100 chart. The B-side track, "Leaving's Not Leaving," was released on the soundtrack for the film, Anywhere But Here on November 2, 1999.

Track listing
CD/Cassette tape Single
 "Big Deal"* (Al Anderson, Jeffrey Steele) — 3:05
 "Leaving's Not Leaving"** (Diane Warren) — 4:53

* Note: Produced by Wilbur C. Rimes.
** Note: Produced by Don Was and Wilbur C. Rimes.

Chart positions

Year-end charts

References

External links
"Big Deal" official music video at official website.

1999 singles
1999 songs
LeAnn Rimes songs
Songs written by Jeffrey Steele
Songs written by Al Anderson (NRBQ)
Curb Records singles